Neil Jenkins (born 6 January 1982) is an English former footballer who played as a left footed defender and midfielder. He started his career as a trainee at Wimbledon before transferring to the then Division Three side Southend United for two seasons, then joining the non league team of Crawley Town and later Eastbourne Borough. During his career, Jenkins was capped 24 times for the England national team at U16, U18, U19 and U20 age groups.

Career

Southend United
Born in Carshalton, London, Jenkins joined the Essex based team Southend United in July 2002, on a one-year contract. He scored in his debut game against Hull City and by the 2002–03 season was one of the top scoring midfielders with seven goals. One of his best goals was against Lincoln City when he took a 25-yard free kick, although the game was lost 2–1. After renewing his contract, he continued to play throughout the 2003–04 season and was released in May 2004 after scoring 8 goals in 61 appearances.

Crawley Town
In June 2004, Crawley Town manager, Francis Vines, signed Jenkins to boost his squad. In two seasons made 74 appearances and scored five goals and left the club in the summer of 2006.

Eastbourne Borough
July 2006 saw Garry Wilson signing Jenkins to Eastbourne Borough who was in the Conference South and helped the team win promotion at the end of the 2007–08 season via the play-offs into the Conference National. Jenkins played over 100 games for Eastbourne Borough.

Sutton United
On 12 May 2011, it was announced that Jenkins would join Sutton United for the 2011–12 season, the club's first season back in the Conference South, after winning promotion in 2010–11.

Hampton & Richmond Borough F.C.
In February 2012, Jenkins joined Hampton & Richmond Borough F.C. after being released by Sutton United.

Leatherhead F.C.

In January 2013 Jenkins joined Leatherhead.

References

External links

 - Does not show pre-Conference stats
Profile at Southend United F.C.

1982 births
Living people
English footballers
England youth international footballers
Wimbledon F.C. players
Southend United F.C. players
Crawley Town F.C. players
Eastbourne Borough F.C. players
Sutton United F.C. players
Hampton & Richmond Borough F.C. players
Leatherhead F.C. players
English Football League players
National League (English football) players
Association football defenders
Association football midfielders